Denis Žerić (born 21 March 1998) is a Bosnian professional footballer who plays as a midfielder for Rudar Kakanj, a First League of FBiH club.

Personal life
His father, Senad Žerić, was a Bosnian international footballer.

Honours
Željezničar
Bosnian Cup: 2017–18

See also
List of FK Željezničar Sarajevo players

References

External links
Denis Žerić at Sofascore

1998 births
Living people
Footballers from Sarajevo
Bosnia and Herzegovina footballers
Premier League of Bosnia and Herzegovina players
First League of the Federation of Bosnia and Herzegovina players
FK Željezničar Sarajevo players
FK Igman Konjic players
FK Goražde players
FK Sloboda Tuzla players
NK Vis Simm-Bau players
FK Rudar Kakanj players
Bosnia and Herzegovina youth international footballers
Association football midfielders